Hunter Reese Peña is an American actor, singer, and writer born to Mexican immigrant parents. Hunter is best known for portraying "Ricky Vela" in the Netflix television series Selena: The Series.

Life 
Hunter is a bilingual actor in Hollywood, speaking both English and Spanish. Hunter grew up in the Central Valley in the state of California. Hunter was taught the acting technique, the Meisner technique to him by Sanford Meisner alum Don Bloomfield at The DBA Studio.

Career 
In Selena: The Series, Hunter plays "Ricky Vela," a brilliant keyboard player who initially refuses to join the Quintanilla family band (Selena y Los Dinos), but then later accepts. Throughout the course of the series Hunter's character becomes one of A.B. Quintanilla’s greatest collaborative songwriting partners, penning some of Selena's greatest hits. Among the Selena hits penned by Ricky are fan-favorites like No Me Queda Mas, Fotos Y Recuerdos, El Chico del Apartamento 512.

Hunter showed his commitment to the role of Ricky by gaining 60 pounds for his portrayal. Making his casting in Selena: The Series even more meaningful, Hunter revealed to Esquire Magazine: Mexico that Selena was his childhood hero.

Advocacy 
Hunter is an outspoken Latino actor who advocates for the advancement of Latino portrayals in media. Hunter has spoken out about the lack of Latino representation in American media, even though the Latino population represents 18% of the country's population. Adding also, that the current representation of Latinos in media (as of 2020) can often be limited to harmful stereotypes. Hunter stated that, because of this, the creation of Selena: The Series (based on Selena's life) is even more important, because it showcases Latino actors in roles that are groundbreakingly normal.

Filmography

References

External links 

American actors
21st-century American male singers
21st-century American singers
American male singer-songwriters
Year of birth missing (living people)
Living people
People from California
American musicians of Mexican descent